Ilya Mark Scheinker was a Russian neurologist and neuropathologist who in 1936 collaborated with Josef Gerstmann and Ernst Sträussler to describe Gerstmann–Sträussler–Scheinker syndrome, a variant of Creutzfeldt–Jakob disease.

They studied at the University of Jena, and the University of Vienna, graduating in 1922, authoring several papers regarding multiple sclerosis. After the anschluss, he fled to Paris, working with Georges Guillain at Salpêtrière from 1938, before emigrating to New York in 1941 after the Nazi invasion of France. With assistance from Tracy Putnam, he found work at the Cincinnati General Hospital as head of neuropathology, where he authored several landmark textbooks, before opening a renowned private practice. After suffering a Myocardial infarction in 1950, he returned to New York where he was offered a teaching position at New York Medical College, until his death two years later.

References 

Austrian neurologists
American neurologists
Russian neurologists
Jewish American scientists
1952 deaths